Vicomte Olivier Charles Camille Emmanuel de Rouge (11 April 1811 – 27 December 1872) was a French Egyptologist, philologist and a member of the House of Rougé.

Biography 
He was born on 11 April 1811, in Paris, the son of Charles Camille Augustin de Rougé, Count de Rougé and Adelaide Charlotte de la Porte de Riantz (1790–1852).

He was a member of the Order of the Legion of Honour, member of the Institut de France, curator of the Egyptian Museum of the Louvre (1849), State Councillor (1854) and professor of Egyptian archaeology at the Collège de France (1864). He wrote several books on Egypt and its history.

He died on 27 December 1872, in Château de Bois-Dauphin to Precigne, Sarthe.

Busts of de Rouge are held in the Louvre and the Cairo Museum in Egypt.

Publications
 Mémoire sur l'inscription du tombeau d'Ahmès, chef des nautoniers (1851)
 Le Poème de Pentaour (1861)
 Rituel funéraire des anciens égyptiens (1861–1863)
 Recherches sur les monuments qu'on peut attribuer aux six premières dynasties de Manéthon (1865)
 Chrestomathie égyptienne, ou Choix de textes égyptiens transcrits, traduits et accompagnés d'un commentaire perpétuel et précédés d'un abrégé grammatical (1867–1876)
 Inscriptions hiéroglyphiques copiées en Égypte pendant la mission scientifique de M. le Vte Emmanuel de Rougé, publiées par M. le Vte Jacques de Rougé (4 volumes, 1877–1879)
 Œuvres diverses (6 volumes, 1907–1918)

References

1811 births
1872 deaths
Marquesses of Rougé
French Egyptologists
Members of the Académie des Inscriptions et Belles-Lettres
People associated with the Louvre